Miguel Angel Varvello (born 13 March 1943 in Cañada de Gomez, Santa Fe Province, Argentina) is an Argentinian musician who plays and teaches the bandoneon.

Early years
He was only six years old when he discovered the bandoneon, it was love at first sight, and his family was then faced with the difficult task of finding him a small instrument, known as a bandoneon 3/4, so that he could begin his studies. His first teacher was Tito Aparicio. He never planned on a career as a musician, it merely happened.

At the age of eight, he appeared as a soloist on radio stations LT2 and LT8 of the city of Rosario. Then, he began to work as a freelance bandeoneonist. He perfected his technique with Jose Bustamante and, like Anibal Troilo and Astor Piazzolla before him, he benefited from the influence of mythical Rosario Bandoneon player Antonio Rios. He also studied harmony, counterpoint and composition with Titi Rossi.

Career
Today he is a player with and exceptional technique, combined with his natural gift for discovering and illuminating the natural spaces in music. At 27 years old, moved to Buenos Aires, where he became one of the most sought-after bandoneon players on the tango scene, and played with many different groups, including the Jose Basso, Osvaldo Berlinghieri, Alberto Di Paulo, Carlos Lazari, Osvaldo Piro, Osvaldo Requena, Francisco Rotundo and Hector Varela tango orchestras. He also established his own groups, with which he performed extensively in the better known tango venues of Buenos Aires such as Michelangelo, Caño 14 and La Ciudad, and toured all over the world.

He created Ensamble Trio (bandoneon, piano and bass), played duos with guitarist Jorge Labanca and, together with bandoneonist Lisandro Adrover, set up the revolutionary nonet Ensamble Porteño (flute, clarinet, two violins, two bandoneons, piano, bass and percussion). These groups mainly used Varvello's own arrangements and played and recorded many of his works. The albums Despertar en Buenos Aires (Ensamble Porteño, 1978), Momentos Inestables (Ensamble Trio, 1984) and Devenir (Duoo Varvello- Labanca, 1989) bear witness to his work of those years.

He is currently a member of the orchestra accompanying the highly acclaimed show Forever Tango which has been staged the world over, including Europe, Japan and de U.S. In 2002, the famous company TESTIGO published "A magic instrument", where this exceptional artist, brings awareness of the uniqueness of this incredible instrument in classical music, a unique feat of this kind, he played Bach, Schubert, Chopin, Brahms, and also tango music.

In 2003 the company Zaf records from Argentina, published "Tangos de Vanguardia" Trio Ensemble, under his direction and arrangements. Also acts as musical director of the show "Tango Dreams", in appearances with the symphony orchestras of Albuquerque, New Mexico and Long Beach, California, USA, as well in the city of Tokyo, Japan.

Orchestra
His orchestra participated in the activities of the Montreal International Tango Festival of 2006 & 2007. He also made recordings of bandoneon "solos" for Universal Studios, U.S. music division, with participation in the project "Cafe de los Maestros," making presentations 2008 in Paris and Lyon, Buenos Aires, Oman, Brussels and many more. Also participated in the  FESTIVAL DE TANGO DE BUENOS AIRES 2010, the nightly tribute to Rovira.

He interpreted as a soloist has performed in rooms Buenos Aires as the salon's Golden Colon Theater, Teatro San Martin, Faculty of Belgrano, National Radio, in the College of Music and at the museum Castagnino the city of Rosario Mr. Varvello is extremely active as arranger and composer. His Works are published by Editorial Lagos S.R.L./ Warner Chappell in Argentina, and by Tonos Musikverlag GmbH in Germany. Mr. Varvello also teaches extensively.

Music CD
In 2012, Mr. Varvello just released  a new cd, again in classical music with  the famous company TESTIGO, "Concerto for bandoneon", this album includes a concert for bandoneon with strings, piano, harp, timpani and percussion,  in three movements,  and is accompanied by works of Frédéric Chopin, Johann Sebastian Bach and Achille-Claude Debussy, and tangos of Agustín Bardi, Eduardo Rovira Astor Piazzolla.

Personal
He lives in Buenos Aires with his wife and children, and receives students from everywhere in the world "Teaching the bandoneon is a way of being in contact with the music I love. And it is very stimulating to see how students gradually discover that their relationship with the bandoneon is something personal and specific to each of them".

Also Mr. Varvello has participated in a tribute to Eduardo Rovira conducted by National University of Lanus in Argentine,  and interpret among other works "Bandomania"

References

 Festival del Tango en Montreal https://web.archive.org/web/20080703033415/http://www.festivaldetangodemontreal.qc.ca/Festival_de_tango_2007/FITM_program_en_2007.html
  
 Diario Clarin, edición jueves 27.05.02 
 
 Diario Clarin, edición jueves 06.07.09 

 Gobierno de la Ciudad de Buenos Aires, Argentina, "Mundial de Tango 2009"  https://web.archive.org/web/20110706083756/http://www.mundialdetango.gov.ar/home09/web/es/biographies/show/v/artist/30.html
 At Royal Opera House Muscat  "CAFE DE LOS MAESTROS",  Wednesday and Thursday 13 and 14 October 2010, Oman Auditorium - Al Bustan Palace, http://www.rohmuscat.org/Eventdetails6.aspx
 journal Pagina 12, August 19, 2010, FESTIVAL DE TANGO DE BUENOS AIRES TUVO SU NOCHE ROVIRA. by Por Karina Micheletto http://www.pagina12.com.ar/diario/suplementos/espectaculos/3-19007-2010-08-19.html
 journal La Nacion, August 15, 2010, "Una vuelta de tuerca al tango, en los sesenta" By Mauro Apicella, http://www.lanacion.com.ar/nota.asp?nota_id=1294733
 Journal Telam, October 27, 2012, "Miguel Varvello: el bandoneón en el mundo de la música clásica" https://web.archive.org/web/20121031033431/http://www.telam.com.ar/nota/42209/

External links
List of compositions

1943 births
Living people
Argentine musicians
Tango musicians